A list of British films released in 1997.

1997

See also
 1997 in film
 1997 in British music
 1997 in British radio
 1997 in British television
 1997 in the United Kingdom
 List of 1997 box office number-one films in the United Kingdom

References

External links

1997
Films
Lists of 1997 films by country or language